Nashville en direct is an album by the French singer Johnny Hallyday.

Track listing

# Disk 1 Drole de métier
 Mon p'tit loup (ça va faire mal)
 Nashville Blues
 Toi tais-toi
 Saoûle à mourir
 Je sais que tu ne peux pas trouver mieux ailleurs
 Génération banlieue
 J'aimerais pouvoir encore souffrir comme ça
 Au jour le jour
 Drôle de métier
 La tournée
 J'ai du sentiment pour toi
 Quand ça vous brise le cœur

# Disk 2 Spécial Enfants du Rock
 Toi tais-toi
 Mon p'tit loup (ça va faire mal)
 J'aimerais pouvoir encore souffrir comme ça
 Saoûle à mourir
 Quand ça vous brise le cœur
 Je sais que tu ne peux pas trouver mieux ailleurs
 L'idole des jeunes
 Blue Suede Shoes, (a duet by Carl Perkins)
 Les années monos
 Si j'étais un charpentier-If I Were a Carpenter, (a duet by Emmylou Harris, and Tony Joe White guitar)
 Polk Salad Annie, (a duet by Tony Joe White)
 Johnny reviens-Johnny B. Goode, (a duet by Stray Cats and Carl Perkins)
 Nashville Blues, (a duet by Don Everly)
 That's All Right Mama, (a duet by Stray Cats)
 Honey Don't, (a duet by Carl Perkins)

References

1984 albums
Johnny Hallyday albums
Philips Records albums